Jung Eun-woo (born Jung Dong-jin on April 10, 1986) is a South Korean actor. He has starred in television dramas such as One Well-Raised Daughter (2013-2014) and The Return of Hwang Geum-bok (2015).

Personal life
Jang dated actress Park Han-byul.

Filmography

Television series

Film

Awards and nominations

References

External links 
 
 Jung Eun-woo at Blue Dragon Entertainment 
 
 
 
 

1986 births
Living people
South Korean male television actors
South Korean male film actors
Dongguk University alumni
People from Incheon